The Toro Rosso STR12 is a Formula One racing car designed and constructed by Scuderia Toro Rosso to compete during the 2017 Formula One season. The car made its competitive début at the 2017 Australian Grand Prix. It was initially driven by Daniil Kvyat and Carlos Sainz, Jr., however both drivers were replaced by Pierre Gasly and Brendon Hartley towards the end of the season, after the former was dropped from the Red Bull programme, and the latter began a 2018 contract with Renault four races early. 

The STR12 is powered by engines supplied by Renault after the team used 2015-specification Ferrari power units throughout the  season; however, the engines were rebadged and the engine and chassis package run under the name 'Toro Rosso'.

Complete Formula One results
(key) (results in bold indicate pole position; results in italics indicate fastest lap)

Notes
† – Driver failed to finish the race, but was classified as they had completed greater than 90% of the race distance.

References

Toro Rosso Formula One cars
2017 Formula One season cars